The Shadow Secretary of State for Transport is a political post in the United Kingdom. It has been consistently held by a member of the Official Opposition Shadow Cabinet since May 1979. The Shadow Secretary helps hold the Transport Secretary and junior ministers to account and is the lead spokesperson on transport matters for his or her party. Should the relevant party take office, the Shadow Secretary would be a likely candidate to become Transport Secretary.

At various times, the post has been called Shadow Minister for Transport (including from 1979 to 1981), Shadow Secretary of State for the Environment, Transport and the Regions, Shadow Secretary of State for Transport, Local Government and the Regions, and Shadow Secretary of State for Environment and Transport.

Shadow Secretaries of State

Notes

References

Official Opposition (United Kingdom)